Christina Kokotou (born 9 January 1972 in Agrinio) is a Greek race walker.

Achievements

References

1972 births
Living people
Greek female racewalkers
Athletes (track and field) at the 2000 Summer Olympics
Athletes (track and field) at the 2004 Summer Olympics
Olympic athletes of Greece
Sportspeople from Agrinio
21st-century Greek women